Buena Vista is a historic plantation house located in Roanoke, Virginia.  It was built about 1840, and is a two-story, brick Greek Revival style dwelling with a shallow hipped roof and two-story, three-bay wing.  The front facade features a massive two-story diastyle Greek Doric order portico.  Buena Vista was built for George Plater Tayloe and his wife, Mary (Langhorne) Tayloe. George was the son of John Tayloe III and Anne Ogle Tayloe of the noted plantation Mount Airy in Richmond County and who built The Octagon House in Washington D.C. The property was acquired by the City of Roanoke in 1937, and was used as a city park and recreation center.

It was listed on the National Register of Historic Places in 1974.

Earlier History

There are handwritten notes on the deed card that describe a much earlier history of the property. “The first building on this tract was log and frame. In 1853 a brick building was built by Geo. P. Tayloe. In 1889 George P. Tayloe enlarged and modernized the present building. David Bryan, Sr. will called this building the mansion house. The Tayloe papers refer to it as Roanoke – and later as Buena Vista. This tract was originally called the “Bottoms” and at the lower end was the Totera town visited by Batts Wood and Fallam in Sept 1671.”
Ownership History

References

Plantation houses in Virginia
Houses on the National Register of Historic Places in Virginia
Greek Revival houses in Virginia
Houses completed in 1840
Houses in Roanoke, Virginia
National Register of Historic Places in Roanoke, Virginia
Tayloe family of Virginia
Tayloe family residences